Usman Afzaal (born 9 June 1977) is a Pakistani born English cricketer who has played three Test matches for England, all against Australia in 2001. He is a left-handed middle order batsman and occasional left arm slow bowler.

He started his first-class career with Nottinghamshire, and was awarded the NBC Denis Compton Award in 1996, but left the county after the 2003 season to play for Northamptonshire. Towards the end of 2007 season he left Northamptonshire and signed a three-year contract with Surrey.

From 2013 to 2015, he owned an Indian restaurant opposite Trent Bridge.

References

External links
 

1977 births
English cricketers
Pakistani emigrants to the United Kingdom
England Test cricketers
Northamptonshire cricketers
Nottinghamshire cricketers
Surrey cricketers
Marylebone Cricket Club cricketers
NBC Denis Compton Award recipients
Punjabi people
Cricketers from Rawalpindi
Living people
British Asian cricketers
British sportspeople of Pakistani descent